Giannis Kalitzakis (born 10 February 1966) is a Greek former professional footballer who played as a center back. His nickname was "The Ninja" due to his hard acrobatic tackles and very strong defensive style. He is currently the General manager at Panathinaikos B.

Club career
Kalitzakis started his career in Panelefsiniakos, where he played three and a half season and after playing for another half season at Diagoras he signed for Panathinaikos. In the "greens" he quickly established himself as a key player and irreplaceable, he became especially loved by the world and did a lot important career for a whole decade, being also captain of the team, winning 4 championships, 6 Greek Cups and 3 Super cups, including 3 doubles. He participated in very important European nights of the club, including the course of the team to the semi-finals of the UEFA Champions League in 1996.

In the summer of 1997, he was released by Panathinaikos and the people of AEK Athens did not miss the opportunity to sign him. He had a pretty good presence for three years with many different partners by his side, without usually losing his place in the lineup. Despite this, he did not reach the standards of performance that he previously achieved at Panathinaikos. Kalitzakis with AEK won 1 cup in 2000. He left the team in 2000 following the decision of the coach, Giannis Pathiakakis. After AEK he played for one season at Ethnikos Asteras before ending his career.

International career
Kalitzakis played for Greece from 16 December 1987 to 1999. He had 71 caps in total, including three appearances at the 1994 FIFA World Cup.

After football
After the end of his career, he served as the head of Panelefsiniakos' academies and general captain of Paniliakos. In 2009 he returned to Panathinaikos as a member of the scouting department, a position he held for a year. In 2022 he became General manager of Panathinaikos B

Honours

Panathinaikos
Alpha Ethniki: 1989–90, 1990–91, 1994–95, 1995–96
Greek Cup: 1987–88, 1988–89, 1990–91, 1992–93, 1993–94, 1994–95
Greek Super Cup: 1988, 1993, 1994

AEK Athens 
Greek Cup: 1999–2000

References

External links

1966 births
Living people
Footballers from Elefsina
Super League Greece players
Panathinaikos F.C. players
AEK Athens F.C. players
Diagoras F.C. players
Ethnikos Asteras F.C. players
1994 FIFA World Cup players
Greek footballers
Greece international footballers
Association football central defenders
Panelefsiniakos F.C. players
Panathinaikos F.C. non-playing staff